Jacob Alexander Grandison (born April 2, 1998) is an American college basketball player for the Duke Blue Devils of the Atlantic Coast Conference (ACC). He previously played for the Holy Cross Crusaders and the Illinois Fighting Illini.

High school career
Grandison began his high school career playing for Berkeley High School. Grandison started his sophomore year on junior varsity, but he was elevated to the varsity team. He did not play basketball his last two years of high school. He committed himself to continue to train with Chris Garlington at Overtime Sports Academy (CA). In May 2016, Grandison's senior year of high school, he was seen, by Team Lillard's head coach, Raymond Young, playing basketball on a non-sponsored AAU team. Coach Raym Young invited Grandison to play basketball on its Adidas sponsored AAU team supported by Oakland's very-own Damian Lillard. This experience permitted, for the first time, Division I coaches to see Grandison compete from May to July 2016, following his graduation from his public high school. During spring 2016, Grandison decided to attended a post-graduate high school year at Phillips Exeter Academy in Exeter, New Hampshire for the 2016–17 season. Grandison was named Third-team Class A All-New England Honors and led the Exonians to a NEPSAC Class A championship, where he scored 20 points in the final, championship game and was named MVP of the tournament. His success at Phillips Exeter led to Grandison being offered a Division-I scholarship to play for Holy Cross, where he ended up committing.

College career
Grandison began his college career at Holy Cross, where he played in all 31 games and started 18 games his freshman year. During his first year, he averaged nine points a game and led his team in scoring six times and rebounding nine times. As a sophomore, Grandison started in all 33 games. He led the team in scoring with an average of 13.9 points per game, which was 11th in the Patriot League, and was second on the team in recounting with five rebounds per game. Along with this, Grandison shot 36.5 percent from three with a team high of 69 three-pointers, which was eighth in the Patriot league. Some individual highlights for the season included scoring a double-double of 21 points and a career-high 10 assists against Stony Brook on November 16, 2018, a career-high of 25 points against Iona on December 30, 2018, and a double-double of 22 points and a career-high 16 rebounds against Lafayette on March 5, 2019. After two years at Holy Cross, Grandison transferred to Illinois.

After sitting out the 2019–20 season because of NCAA transfer rules, Grandison started his Illinois career as a bench player. However, after Illinois suffered consecutive losses to Maryland and Ohio State, Coach Brad Underwood decided to shake up his lineup and put Grandison in the starting lineup for their game against Penn State on January 19, 2020. This proved to be a successful change as Illinois beat the Nittany Lions 79–65, and Grandison started the final 15 of 16 games of the season. With Grandison in the lineup, Illinois moved from 22 to 2 in the AP poll and won the 2021 Big Ten men's basketball tournament. For the entire season, Grandison averaged 4.6 points and 3.4 rebounds a game. For his senior season, Grandison saw a more increased role as he started in 23 of the 30 games he played. On February 19, 2022, Grandison had his most points as an Illini with 24 points and tied a career-high in three pointers made in a game with six as he helped lead his team to a win against Michigan State 79–74. However, on March 3, 2022, Grandison sustained a shoulder injury against Penn State, which caused him to miss the last game of the regular season and the Big Ten tournament and limited his playing time in the NCAA tournament. Despite this, he averaged 9.6 points and 3.8 rebounds per game, which was fourth on the team for both, and earned an Academic All-Big Ten selection.

National team career
Through his mother, Grandison, an American, also has Finnish citizenship. Grandison's Finnish citizenship permitted him to represent the Finland men's national basketball team in its summer training camp and their Olympic preparatory national team matches in 2021.

Career statistics

College

|-
| style="text-align:left;"| 2017–18
| style="text-align:left;"| Holy Cross
| 31 || 18 || 27.5 || .442 || .317 || .741 || 4.5 || 2.0 || .8 || .2 || 9.0
|-
| style="text-align:left;"| 2018–19
| style="text-align:left;"| Holy Cross
| 33 || 33 || 34.6 || .429 || .365 || .800 || 5.0 || 2.9 || 1.1 || .3 || 13.9
|-
| style="text-align:left;"| 2019–20
| style="text-align:left;"| Illinois
| style="text-align:center;" colspan="11"|  Redshirt
|-
| style="text-align:left;"| 2020–21
| style="text-align:left;"| Illinois
| 30 || 16 || 15.3 || .526 || .415 || .957 || 3.4 || 1.3 || .5 || .1 || 4.6
|-
| style="text-align:left;"| 2021–22
| style="text-align:left;"| Illinois
| 30 || 23 || 25.0 || .455 || .410 || .824 || 3.8 || 2.3 || .3 || .2 || 9.6
|-
| style="text-align:left;"| 2022–23
| style="text-align:left;"| Duke
| 34 || 0 || 15.9 || .397 || .333 || .889 || 2.1 || 1.4 || .4 || .1 || 4.4
|- class="sortbottom"
| style="text-align:center;" colspan="2"| Career
| 158 || 90 || 23.7 || .442 || .364 || .814 || 3.8 || 2.0 || .6 || .2 || 8.3

Personal life
Grandison was born in San Francisco, California and grew up in Oakland, California. His mother, Carina, is from Helsinki, Finland, and she had met Grandison's father, James, in California when she was an exchange student in the U.S. He competitively swam growing up for the Oakland Undercurrents and competed in the 50 freestyle at the Junior Olympics. He graduated from the University of Illinois, Urbana-Champaign with his bachelor's (B.S.) degree in earth, society, and environmental sustainability in 2021, and graduated with his master's (M.S.) degree from the University of Illinois GIES School of Business in business management in May 2022.

References

External links
Duke Blue Devils bio
ESPN profile
Illinois Fighting Illini bio
Holy Cross Crusaders bio

1998 births
Living people
American men's basketball players
Basketball players from San Francisco
Duke Blue Devils men's basketball players
Holy Cross Crusaders men's basketball players
Illinois Fighting Illini men's basketball players
Phillips Exeter Academy alumni
Shooting guards
American people of Finnish descent
Finnish people of African-American descent